Nuclear factor related to kappa-B-binding protein is a protein that in humans is encoded by the NFRKB gene.

References

Further reading